PGDS protein is a protein that in humans is encoded by the HPGDS gene.

Prostaglandin-D synthase is a sigma class glutathione-S-transferase family member. The enzyme catalyzes the conversion of PGH2 to PGD2 and plays a role in the production of prostanoids in the immune system and mast cells. The presence of this enzyme can be used to identify the differentiation stage of human megakaryocytes.

See also
 Prostaglandin D2 synthase PTGDS

References

Further reading